Elizabeth Greer "Beanie" Feldstein (born June 29, 1993) is an American actress. She first gained recognition for her starring roles in the comedy film Neighbors 2: Sorority Rising (2016), the comedy-drama film Lady Bird (2017), and the coming-of-age comedy film Booksmart (2019), the latter of which earned her a nomination for the Golden Globe Award for Best Actress – Motion Picture Comedy or Musical.

Feldstein has appeared on the Broadway stage, making her debut as Minnie Fay in Hello, Dolly! (2017–18) and portraying the lead role of Fanny Brice in the first revival of Funny Girl (2022), a performance for which she earned a nomination for the Drama League Award for Distinguished Performance. In 2021, she portrayed Monica Lewinsky in the third season of the FX anthology series American Crime Story: Impeachment.

Early life and education 
Feldstein was born in Los Angeles, the only daughter of Sharon Lyn, a costume designer and fashion stylist, and Richard Feldstein, a tour accountant for Guns N' Roses.  Feldstein is Jewish. She is the youngest of three children; her elder brother is actor Jonah Hill; their eldest brother, Maroon 5 manager Jordan Feldstein (1977–2017), died suddenly of a blood clot at age 40.

Her nanny nicknamed her "Beanie" when she was an infant, and her brothers used it as well. She attended the Harvard-Westlake School in Los Angeles as well as Stagedoor Manor, a theatre camp in New York. She and fellow Broadway and film actor Ben Platt have been best friends since high school.

She graduated from Wesleyan University in 2015 with a degree in sociology.

Career
Feldstein made her acting debut in 2002, appearing in the ABC comedy series My Wife and Kids. In 2012, she played Megan in the musical television pilot Madison High. In 2015, Feldstein appeared as a guest in the third season of Netflix's comedy series Orange Is the New Black. That same year, she played the role of Anna in the comedy film Fan Girl.

Feldstein received recognition with a more significant role in the comedy film Neighbors 2: Sorority Rising, alongside Seth Rogen and Zac Efron. The film was released on May 20, 2016.

Feldstein was cast to play Lydia Harris in HBO's period drama pilot The Devil You Know. She guest starred in an episode of the NBC sitcom Will & Grace.

On October 18, 2016, Feldstein's casting as Minnie Fay in the 2017 Broadway production of Hello, Dolly! starring Bette Midler was announced. Feldstein made her Broadway debut in this role. The show began previews on March 15, 2017, and opened on April 20, 2017. Her performance earned positive reviews from critics.

Feldstein starred in Whitney Cummings' directorial debut comedy film The Female Brain, which premiered at the LA Film Festival in June 2017. She co-starred alongside Saoirse Ronan and Laurie Metcalf in Greta Gerwig's solo directorial debut, Lady Bird, which was released to critical acclaim in 2017. The film earned a nomination for the Academy Award for Best Picture. Along with the cast, she was nominated for the Screen Actors Guild Award for Outstanding Performance by a Cast in a Motion Picture.

In 2019, Feldstein had a recurring role as Jenna in the first season of the television horror comedy series What We Do in the Shadows, an adaptation of the film of the same title. Her performance earned positive reviews from critics. She was not able to return for the second season, as was originally planned, due to other filming commitments.

Also in 2019, she starred in Olivia Wilde's directorial debut, the high school comedy Booksmart. Her performance garnered widespread critical acclaim and a nomination for the Golden Globe Award for Best Actress – Motion Picture Comedy or Musical. She later portrayed the British lead character Johanna Morrigan in the coming-of-age comedy film How to Build a Girl, which was an adaptation of Caitlin Moran's 2014 novel of the same title. The film and her performance garnered positive reviews from critics.

In 2020, she guest starred as Tess Anderson in the ABC medical drama series Grey's Anatomy. Feldstein stated that it had been a dream of hers to appear on the series since she was a child. She voiced a role in The Simpsons, featuring as a support group therapist in the episode "Frinkcoin". She appeared in the television specials Saturday Night Seder and Take Me to the World: A Sondheim 90th Celebration, performing a cover of "It Takes Two" from Into the Woods with Ben Platt on the latter program.

Feldstein starred in the drama film The Humans, based on Stephen Karam's one-act play of the same title.

On August 6, 2019, it was announced that she would star as Monica Lewinsky in the third season of American Crime Story, subtitled Impeachment. On August 29, 2019, it was announced that Feldstein would be starring in Richard Linklater's film adaptation of Merrily We Roll Along, which would be shot over the course of twenty years. Principal photography of the first section of the film has already been completed. Feldstein is set to star alongside Ben Platt and Paul Mescal.

On August 11, 2021, it was announced that she would star as Fanny Brice in the 2022 Broadway revival of Funny Girl. Reviews of her performance were mixed to negative. Jesse Green at The New York Times called her "good" but "not stupendous," while Adrian Horton at The Guardian opined that Feldstein "simply isn't" a "power singer." Johnny Oleksinski of The New York Post remarked that "Feldstein is, I’m sorry to say, not giving a Broadway-caliber performance." Feldstein subsequently left the production and was later replaced by Lea Michele on September 6, with standby Julie Benko portraying the role in the interim.

Personal life
Feldstein identifies as queer. 
She met English film producer Bonnie Chance Roberts on the set of the 2019 film How to Build a Girl, and the two became engaged in June 2022.

Filmography

Film

Television

Music videos

Stage

Awards and nominations

References

External links 
 

21st-century American actresses
Actresses from Los Angeles
American film actresses
American television actresses
American child actresses
Harvard-Westlake School alumni
Jewish American actresses
Living people
Wesleyan University alumni
LGBT people from California
LGBT Jews
American queer actresses
Queer women
21st-century American Jews
21st-century LGBT people
1993 births